A consumer watchdog may refer to:

 Consumer organization
 Consumer Watchdog, an organization that advocates for taxpayer and consumer interests in the United States
 Consumer Watchdog (Botswana), a private consumer rights advocacy group in Botswana
 Watchdog journalism

See also 
 Watchdog (disambiguation)
 List of consumer organizations

Consumer rights organizations